Charles William Bamforth, FRSB, FIBD (born June 1952), known as Charlie Bamforth, is an English scientist who specialises in malting and brewing. He is a former president of the Institute of Brewing and Distilling and was also Anheuser-Busch Endowed Professor of Malting and Brewing Sciences at University of California, Davis between 1999 and 2018. Following retirement from the University as Distinguished Professor Emeritus, he became Senior Quality Adviser to the Sierra Nevada Brewing Company. 

In addition to a career in the world of beer, Bamforth is also an extensively published author in English association football. He
wrote regularly in the match day programmes of Wolverhampton Wanderers, Birmingham City, Walsall and Shrewsbury Town, but also has penned numerous magazine articles and conducted many interviews for the nostalgia site www.wolvesheroes.com. He has written two soccer books, most recently the autobiography of Wolves, Nottingham Forest, Derby County and England winger Alan Hinton, who became a North American legend as a player with Vancouver Whitecaps and as a coach with Seattle Sounders.

Life

Career 
Charles Bamforth was born in Upholland, outside Wigan in Lancashire in 1952. His father (who died four months before Charlie 
was born) was a head teacher. Following schooling at Upholland Grammar School, Charlie graduated from the University of Hull with a Bachelor of Science degree in biochemistry in 1973 and went on to receive a PhD from the same institution in 1977. After a period as a postdoctoral fellow at Sheffield University, he joined Brewing Research International, but in 1983, he went to work at Bass Brewers, where he was Research Manager and Quality Assurance Manager. In 1991, Bamforth became director of research at  Brewing Research International. Two years later, he received a Doctor of Science degree from Hull University. In 1999, he took up the post Anheuser-Busch Endowed Professor of Malting and Brewing Sciences at UC Davis. Bamforth retired from UC Davis in 2018 and was appointed Distinguished Professor Emeritus. Since January 2019, he has been Senior Quality Advisor at the Sierra Nevada Brewing Company.

Between 2014 and 2016, he was President of the Institute of Brewing and Distilling (IBD). He is also a Fellow of the IBD, as well as a Fellow of the Society of Biology and Fellow of the International Academy of Food Science and Technology, and was the Editor-in-Chief of the Journal of the American Society of Brewing Chemists for 18 years. He was Visiting Professor of Brewing at Heriot-Watt University and has been Honorary Professor at the University of Nottingham since 2006.

Research 
According to his university profile, Bamforth's research interests are malting and brewing, specifically wholesomeness of beer, including studies on the psychophysics of beer perception, on the residues from non-starchy polysaccharide digestion that constitute soluble fiber and prebiotics in beer. His research also embraces the enzymology of the brewing process, foam stability, preventing oxidation in wort and beer and alternative paradigms for beer production.

Honours and awards 
In 2018, Bamforth received the Recognition Award from the Brewers Association, the Institute of Brewing and Distilling's Horace Brown Medal, and the Award of Honor by the Master Brewers Association of the Americas. He has also received an honorary doctorate from Heriot-Watt University in 2015; the Award of Distinction from the American Society of Brewing Chemists (2011); and the Cambridge Prize from the Institute of Brewing (1984).. In 2022 he was made an Honorary Life Member of the Master Brewers Association of the Americas.

Bibliography 
A selection of recent works is included below:

 Bamforth, C. W., Practical Guides for Beer Quality: Beer Safety and Wholesomeness (American Society of Brewing Chemists, 2021)
 Bamforth, C. W., In Praise of Beer (Oxford University Press, 2020).
 Bamforth, C.W. 'Everyday Guide To Beer', (Great Courses, 2020)
 Bamforth, C. W., Practical Guides for Beer Quality: Quality Systems (American Society of Brewing Chemists, 2019)
 Bamforth, C. W., Practical Guides for Beer Quality: Color and Clarity (American Society of Brewing Chemists, 2018)
 Bokulich, N. A. and C. W. Bamforth (eds), Brewing Microbiology: Current Research, Omics and Microbial Ecology (Caister Academic Press, 2017).
 Bamforth, C. W, Practical Guides for Beer Quality: Freshness (American Society of Brewing Chemists, 2017).
 Bamforth, C. W. (ed.), Brewing Materials and Processes: A Practical Approach to Beer Excellence (Elsevier, 2016).
Bamforth, C. W. and R. E. Ward (eds), Oxford Handbook of Food Fermentations (Oxford University Press, 2014).
 Bamforth, C. W., Practical Guides for Beer Quality: Flavor (American Society of Brewing Chemists, 2013).
 , Practical Guides for Beer Quality: Foam, American Society of Brewing Chemists, 2012.
 , Beer is Proof God Loves Us, FT Press, 2010).
 , Beer: Tap into the Art and Science of Brewing, 3rd ed. (Oxford University Press, 2009).
  (ed.), Beer: A Quality Perspective, Handbook of Alcoholic beverages series, Elsevier, 2008).
 , Grape versus Grain (Cambridge University Press, 2008)
  (ed.), Brewing: New Technologies (Woodhead Publishing, 2006)

References

1952 births
English brewers
Living people
Fellows of the Royal Society of Biology
People educated at Upholland Grammar School
People from the Metropolitan Borough of Wigan